The Bahrain national under-20 football team has competed several times in the AFC Youth Championship, and once in the FIFA World Youth Championship.

AFC U-19 Championship

Bahrain national under-20 football team was qualified for the 1987 FIFA World Youth Championship.

FIFA U-20 World Cup

1977 to 1985 = Did not Qualify

1987 = Group Stage

1989 to 2019 = Did not Qualify

References

Asian national under-20 association football teams
Under-20